E-boat was the Western Allies' designation for the fast attack craft (German: Schnellboot, or S-Boot, meaning "fast boat") of the Kriegsmarine during World War II; E-boat could refer to a patrol craft from an armed motorboat to a large Torpedoboot. The name of E-boats was a British designation using the letter E for Enemy,

These were armed with torpedoes and Flak guns; commonly one 37 mm at the stern, one 20 mm at the bow with a twin mount amidships, plus machine guns. Armament varied and some S-100s substituted a 40mm Bofors or, less commonly, a 20mm flakvierling mount for the aft 37mm cannon.

As a result of early war experience of combat against the fast and powerful S-boats, the Royal Navy created its MGB force and later developed better-matched MTBs, using the Fairmile 'D' hull design.

History

Development 
This design was chosen because the theatre of operations of such boats was expected to be the North Sea, English Channel and the Western Approaches. The requirement for good performance in rough seas dictated the use of a round-bottomed displacement hull rather than the flat-bottomed planing hull that was more usual for small, high-speed boats. The shipbuilding company Lürssen overcame many of the disadvantages of such a hull and, with the Oheka II, produced a craft that was fast, strong and seaworthy. This attracted the interest of the Reichsmarine, which in 1929 ordered a similar boat but fitted with two torpedo tubes. This became the S-1, and was the basis for all subsequent E-boats.

After experimenting with the S-1, the Germans made several improvements to the design. Small rudders added on either side of the main rudder could be angled outboard to 30 degrees, creating at high speed what is known as the Lürssen Effect. This drew in an "air pocket slightly behind the three propellers, increasing their efficiency, reducing the stern wave and keeping the boat at a nearly horizontal attitude". This was an important innovation as the horizontal attitude lifted the stern, allowing even greater speed, and the reduced stern wave made E-boats harder to see, especially at night.

The rounded wood planking hull helped reduce weight, and flattened at the stern area, the aft section area was reduced at high speeds, it allowed more hydrodynamic lift.

Operations with the Kriegsmarine 
E boats were primarily used to patrol the Baltic Sea and the English Channel in order to intercept shipping heading for the English ports in the south and east. As such, they were up against Royal Navy and Commonwealth, e.g., Royal Canadian Navy contingents leading up to D-Day, motor gunboats (MGBs), motor torpedo boats (MTBs), motor launches, frigates and destroyers. They were also transferred in small numbers to the Mediterranean, and the Black Sea by river and land transport. Some small E-boats were built as boats for carrying by auxiliary cruisers.

Crew members could earn an award particular to their work—Das Schnellbootkriegsabzeichen—denoted by a badge depicting an E-boat passing through a wreath. The criteria were good conduct, distinction in action, and participating in at least twelve enemy actions. It was also awarded for particularly successful missions, displays of leadership or being killed in action. It could be awarded under special circumstances, such as when another decoration was not suitable.

E-boats of the 6th & 9th flotillas from Cherbourg attacked Exercise Tiger on 28 April 1944, causing about 749 American Army and Navy casualties.

E-boats of the 9th flotilla were the first naval units to respond to the invasion fleet of Operation Overlord. They left Cherbourg harbour at 5 a.m. on 6 June 1944. On finding themselves confronted by the entire invasion fleet, they fired their torpedoes at maximum range and returned to Cherbourg.

During World War II, E-boats claimed 101 merchant ships totalling 214,728 tons. Additional claims include 12 destroyers, 11 minesweepers, eight landing ships, six MTBs, one torpedo boat, one minelayer, one submarine, and a number of smaller craft such as fishing boats. They also damaged two cruisers, five destroyers, three landing ships, one repair ship, one naval tug, and numerous other merchant vessels. Sea mines laid by the E-boats sank 37 merchant ships totalling 148,535 tons, a destroyer, two minesweepers, and four landing ships.

E-boat crews were awarded 23 Knight's Cross of the Iron Crosses and 112 German Crosses in Gold.

Operations in the Black Sea
To boost Axis naval strength in the Black Sea, the OKW ordered to the region the transfer of six E-boats of the 1st S-flotilla, the last to be released from action in the Baltic Sea before refit. The Romanian port of Constanța, in the Black Sea, was chosen as the S-flotilla's headquarters. Transporting the six boats overland from Germany to Romania was an impressive logistical feat. The superstructure and all weapons were removed, leaving only the hull. After a long road journey of 60 hours, the boats arrived at Ingolstadt, where they were transferred back to water and towed towards Linz. Upon reaching the Austrian city, the superstructure was rebuilt, then the journey continued down the Danube to Galați, where the main engines were installed. The E-boats then continued on their own power towards Constanța, where refitting was completed.

The first two boats, S-26 and S-28, arrived in Constanța on 24 May 1942, the second pair, S-72 and S-102 on 3 June, and the final pair, S-27 and S-40 10 days later.  After the sinking of S-27 by a malfunctioning torpedo, four more reserve boats, S-47, S-49, S-51, S-52 were dispatched to the Black Sea, in order to replace boats undergoing maintenance. S-28, S-72 and S-102 were soon relegated to the Constanța Shipyard for engine replacement, leaving only S-26 and the newly commissioned S-49 operational. On 1 January 1944, the 1st S-flotilla numbered six operational boats: S-26, S-42, S-47, S-49, S-52 and S-79 while S-28, S-40, S-45 and S-51 were all out of commission, undergoing repair in Constanța. Three more boats were shipped down the Danube and were being reconstructed at Constanța. On 1 June 1944, 8 boats were operational in Constanța: S-28, S-40, S-47, S-49, S-72, S-131, S-148 and S-149. The boats were however penned in harbor, due to fuel shortage. During July, S-26, S-28, S-40 and S-42 were transferred to Sulina at the mouth of the Danube, where S-42 was fitted with a new propeller. They were joined by S-72 in early August, the rest of the boats remaining in Constanța. On 19 August, S-26, S-40 and S-72 were destroyed in port by a Soviet air attack. On 22 August S-148 hit a mine and sank near Sulina, and on the following day, S-42, S-52 and S-131 were destroyed in Constanța by a Soviet air attack. What remained of the S-flotilla was disbanded after Romania switched sides on the same day.

Italian MS boat

The poor seaworthiness of the Italian-designed MAS boats of World War I and early World War II led its navy to build its own version of E-boats, the CRDA 60 t type, classed MS (Motosilurante). The prototype was designed on the pattern of six German-built E-boats captured from the Yugoslav Navy in 1941. Two of them sank the British light cruiser  in August 1942, the largest warship to be sunk by fast torpedo craft in the Second World War.
After the war these boats served with the Italian Navy, some well into the 1970s.

Service in the Spanish Navy 
The Kriegsmarine supplied the Spanish Francoist Navy with six E-boats during the Spanish Civil War, and six more during the Second World War. Another six were built in Spain with some assistance from Lürssen. A motor boat of the early series, either the Falange or the Requeté, laid two mines off Almería that crippled the British destroyer HMS Hunter on 13 May 1937. The German-built boats were discarded in the 1960s, while some of the Spanish-built ones served until the early 1970s.

Service in China 

The Chinese Nationalist Navy had three S-7-class boats during the Second Sino-Japanese War.
 Yue-22 (岳-22)
 Yue-253 (岳-253)
 Yue-371 (岳-371)
Yue-22 was destroyed by Japanese planes, Yue-371 was sunk by its sailors to avoid being captured by the Japanese soldiers and Yue-253 was captured by the People's Liberation Army during the Chinese Civil War. Yue-253 was renamed "Hoiking" (海鯨), meaning "Seawhale" in Chinese. The People's Liberation Army Navy used it as a patrol boat until 1963.

The Chinese Nationalist government also ordered eight S-30-class E-boats and a tender, Qi Jiguang (戚繼光). These were taken over by the Kriegsmarine in 1939. Qi Jiguang was renamed Tanga.

Service in the Romanian Navy
Germany sold four E-boats to Romania on 14 August 1944. These vessels displaced 65 tons, had a top speed of 30 knots generated by three Mercedes-Benz engines totalling  and were armed with two  torpedo tubes. Each of the four boats had a crew of 25. They were numbered 10 to 13 (formerly S-151, S-152, S-153 and S-154) and served in the Romanian Navy until at least 1954.

Post-war service

Royal Navy 
At the end of the war about 34 E-boats were surrendered to the British. Three boats, S-130 (renamed P5230), S-208 (P5208) and S-212 (P5212) were retained for trials.

Operation Jungle 

The Gehlen Organization, an intelligence agency established by American occupation authorities in Germany in 1946 and manned by former members of the Wehrmacht's Fremde Heere Ost (Foreign Armies East), used the Royal Navy's E-boats in order to infiltrate its agents into the Baltic states and Poland. Royal Navy Commander Anthony Courtney was struck by the potential capabilities of former E-boat hulls, and John Harvey-Jones of the Naval Intelligence Division was put in charge of the project. He discovered that the Royal Navy still had two E-boats, P5230 and P5208, and had them sent to Portsmouth, where one of them, P5230 (ex-S130), was modified to reduce its weight and increase its power with the installation of two Napier Deltic engines of  each.

Lieutenant-Commander  was assigned to command a German crew, recruited by the British MI-6 and funded by the American Office of Policy Coordination. The missions were assigned the codename "Operation Jungle". The boats carried out their missions under the cover of the British Control Commission's Fishery Protection Service, which was responsible for preventing Soviet navy vessels from interfering with German fishing boats and for destroying stray mines. The home port of the boats was Kiel, and operated under the supervision of Harvey-Jones. Manned by Klose and his crew, they usually departed for the island of Bornholm waving the White Ensign, where they would hoist the Swedish flag for a dash to Gotland, and there they would wait for orders from Hamburg. The first mission consisted in the landing of Lithuanian agents at Palanga, Lithuania, in May 1949, and the last one took place in April 1955 in Saaremaa, Estonia. During the last two years of the operation, three new German-built motorboats replaced the old E-boats. Klose was later assigned the command of a patrol boat in the Bundesmarine and became commander-in-chief of the fleet before his retirement in 1978.

Royal Danish Navy 
In 1947, the Danish navy bought twelve former Kriegsmarine boats. These were further augmented in 1951 by six units bought from the Royal Norwegian Navy. The last unit, the P568 Viben, was retired in 1965.

Royal Norwegian Navy 
After World War II, the Norwegian Navy received a number of former Kriegsmarine boats. Six boats were transferred to Denmark in 1951.

Operators

Survivor 

There is just one surviving E-boat, identified as S-130. It was built as hull No. 1030 at the Schlichting boatyard in Travemünde. S-130 was commissioned on 21 October 1943 and took an active part in the war, participating in the Exercise Tiger attack and attacks on the D-Day invasion fleet.

According to Dutch military historian Maurice Laarman:In 1945, S-130 was taken as a British war prize (FPB 5030) and put to use in covert operations. Under the guise of the "British Baltic Fishery Protection Service", the British Secret Intelligence Service MI-6 ferried spies and agents into Eastern Europe. Beginning in May 1949, MI-6 used S-208, (Kommandant Hans-Helmut Klose) to insert agents into Lithuania, Latvia, Estonia, and Poland. The operations were very successful and continued under a more permanent organisation based in Hamburg. In 1952, S-130 joined the operation and the mission was enlarged to include signal intelligence (SIGINT) equipment. In 1954/55, S-130 and S-208 were replaced by a new generation of German S-boote.

S-130 was returned to the newly formed Bundesmarine in March 1957, and operated under the number UW 10. Serving initially in the Unterwasserwaffenschule training sailors in underwater weaponry such as mines and torpedoes, she later became a test boat under the name EF 3.

S-130 was on display in Wilhelmshaven, Germany, having formerly been used as a houseboat.

S-130 was purchased and towed from Wilhelmshaven to the Husbands Shipyard, Marchwood, Southampton, England in January 2003, under the auspices of the British Military Powerboat Trust. In 2004, S-130 was taken to the slipway at Hythe, where, under the supervision of the BMPT, she was prepared and then towed to Mashfords yard in Cremyll, Cornwall, England to await funding for restoration. In 2008, S-130, having been purchased by the Wheatcroft Collection, was set up ashore at Southdown in Cornwall to undergo restoration work involving Roving Commissions Ltd. As of June 2012, this work continues and includes an S130 Members' Club.

Variants 

The Schnellboot design evolved over time. The first had a pair of torpedo tubes on the fore deck.
S-2 class The first production of the E-boat in 1931, based on the S-1; S-1 to S-6 were transferred to Spain
S-7 class Built from 1933, three were sold to China.
S-14 class Improved S-7, built in 1934. Enlarged hull.
S-18 class
Wartime types were:
S-26 class Entered service in 1940. 40 m hull. Torpedo tubes covered by forward deck.

S-30 class
S-38 class
Armored S-38 class Improved S-38 class with armoured bridge. Various armament including 40 mm Bofors or 20 mm Flak aft, MG34 Zwillingsockel midships. (designation 'b' is not Kriegsmarine nomenclature and originated in a postwar American hobby publication).
S-100 class From 1943. 1 × 20 mm in the bow, 2 × 20 mm gun amidships and 37 mm gun aft.
S-151 class
Type 700 Late war design proposal with stern torpedo tubes and 30 mm gun turret forward. Eight boats built, but completed to S-100 design specification.

Specification 
 Length: 
 Weight: up to 120 t
 Speed: 
 Engines: Three 20-cylinder Daimler-Benz MB501 Diesel engines,  each; three propeller shafts.
 Armament:
 2 ×  torpedo tubes (four  torpedoes)
 1 × 20 mm gun, (20 mm single on early boats, twin and special bow version on later classes)
 1 × 40 mm Bofors (some S-38-class boats)

Other AA armament carried on different models included two or more pintle-mounted MG-34s, 3.7 cm Flak 42 (S-100) and 8.6 cm RaG M42 (S-100) or, rarely, one quadruple 20 mm Flakvierling mounts.

See also 
 Daimler-Benz DB 602, V-16 diesel aero-engine that was developed into the MB502 and MB501.
 Fast Attack Craft War Badge
 List of Knight's Cross recipients of the Schnellboot service
 R boat
 Steam gun boat

Notes

References

External links 

 World War II Schnellboot, or E-boat
 Prinz Eugen E-boat site 
 John Drain's model E-boat site
 Five part video podcast documentary about S130 on www.pod3.tv
 
 Die Schnellboot-Seite, "S-Boats in the Kriegsmarine"

Boat types
Cold War patrol vessels of Germany
Motor torpedo boats of the Kriegsmarine
World War II naval ships of Germany
Ships built in Germany
World War II naval ships of Romania
World War II naval ships of China
Ships of the People's Liberation Army Navy
Ships built in Romania